Ismail Mohammad (born Udayan Chowdhury) is a Bangladeshi screenwriter, dialogue and story writer. In 1985, he won Bangladesh National Film Award for Best Screenplay for the film Ma O Chele.

Selected films

Awards and nominations
National Film Awards

References

External links
 
 

Bangladeshi screenwriters
Best Screenplay National Film Award (Bangladesh) winners
Possibly living people
Year of birth missing